Sparty is a popular Hungarian event series, which has been held since 1994 in Budapest's oldest thermal baths. Sparty is the result of a combination (or portmanteau) of the words Spa and Party, and fuses night bathing with club life. Its name is currently registered as trademark in the European Union.

History 
Hungarian bath culture has a long history of hundreds of years, which was founded in the time of the ancient Roman Empire and later developed further under Turkish influence. Due to its historical traditions, Budapest is customarily described as the city of spas, which, besides satisfying domestic needs, makes the Hungarian capital extremely popular among tourists. Sparty built a popular event on these traditions of thermal baths, where the night bathing is complemented with light and laser shows and live music.

Popularity 
The fame of Sparty is well characterized by the fact that 50,000 visitors attend the events each year. In addition to the night bathing Sparties feature DJs playing electro, trip-hop, hip-hop, funk and trance music, moreover alcohol consumption is permitted, hence the outstanding popularity among program tourists and youngsters.

References 

Hungarian culture
Public baths
Thermal baths in Budapest